La Gioconda ("the joyful one" [f.]) may refer to:

 Mona Lisa or La Gioconda, a painting by Leonardo da Vinci
 Lisa del Giocondo, the model depicted in da Vinci's painting
 La Gioconda (opera), an 1876 opera by Amilcare Ponchielli
 La Gioconda (play), tragedy by Gabriele d'Annunzio
 La Gioconda (cafe), a former restaurant in London